Colombia competed at the 1988 Summer Olympics in Seoul, South Korea. 40 competitors, 34 men and 6 women, took part in 34 events in 10 sports.

Medalists

Competitors
The following is the list of number of competitors in the Games.

Athletics

Men's 10.000 metres 
 Pedro Ortiz
 First Round — 29:08.25 (→ did not advance)

Men's Marathon 
 Pedro Ortiz
 Final — 2:23.34 (→ 39th place)

Men's 20 km Walk
 Hector Moreno
 Final — 1:27.06 (→ 33rd place)
 Querubín Moreno
 Final — did not finish (→ no ranking)

Men's 50 km Walk
 Hector Moreno
 Final — 4:01.31 (→ 30th place)

Women's 100 metres
Amparo Caicedo
 First Round — 11.59
 Quarter-Finals — 11.65 (→ did not advance)

Women's 200 metres
Norfalia Carabali
 First Round — 23.78
 Quarter-Finals — 23.96 (→ did not advance)
Ximena Restrepo
 First Round — 24.00 (→ did not advance)

Women's 400 metres
Norfalia Carabali
 First Round — 53.27
 Quarter-Finals — 51.76
 Semi-Finals — 52.65 (→ did not advance)

Women's 4×100 metres Relay
Amparo Caicedo, Norfalia Carabali, Olga Escalante, and  Ximena Restrepo
 First Round — 45.46 (→ did not advance)

Women's 4×400 metres Relay
 Olga Escalante, Norfalia Carabali, Amparo Caicedo, and Ximena Restrepo
 Heat — DSQ (→ did not advance, no ranking)

Women's Discus Throw
 María Isabel Urrutia
 Qualification — 53.82m (→ did not advance)

Women's Shot Put
 María Isabel Urrutia
 Qualification — 15.13m (→ did not advance)

Boxing

Men's Flyweight (– 51 kg) 
 Simon Morales
 First Round — Lost to Setsuo Segawa (JPN), 1:4

Men's Bantamweight (– 54 kg)
 Jorge Julio Rocha →  Bronze Medal
 First Round — Defeated Michael Hormillosa (PHI), RSC-3
 Second Round — Defeated Felix Nieves (PUR), 5:0
 Third Round — Defeated René Breitbarth (GDR), 4:1
 Quarterfinals — Defeated Katsuyoki Matsushima (JPN), 3:2
 Semifinals — Lost to Aleksandar Khristov (BUL), 2:3

Cycling

Seven cyclists, all men, represented Colombia in 1988.

Men's road race
 Juan Arias
 Nelson Rodríguez Serna
 Dubán Ramírez

Men's team time trial
 Ángel Noé Alayón
 Pedro Bonilla
 Orlando Castillo
 Julio Cesar Rodríguez

Equestrianism

Fencing

Five fencers, all men, represented Colombia in 1988.

Men's épée
 Mauricio Rivas
 Juan Miguel Paz
 Joaquin Pinto

Men's team épée
 Oscar Arango, William González, Juan Miguel Paz, Joaquin Pinto, Mauricio Rivas

Judo

Shooting

Swimming

Men's 100m Breaststroke
 Pablo Restrepo
 Heat — 1:04.43 (→ did not advance, 19th place)

Men's 200m Breaststroke
 Pablo Restrepo
 Heat — 2:19.58 (→ did not advance, 20th place)

Weightlifting

Wrestling

See also
Sports in Colombia
Colombia at the 1987 Pan American Games

References

External links
Official Olympic Reports
International Olympic Committee results database

Nations at the 1988 Summer Olympics
1988
Olympics